The Basilica of Saint Hyacinth is a historic church of the Roman Catholic Archdiocese of Chicago, located at 3636 West Wolfram Street in the Avondale neighborhood of Chicago, Illinois.

It is a prime example of the Polish Cathedral style of churches in both its opulence and grand scale.  Along with such monumental religious edifices as St. Mary of the Angels, St. Hedwig's, and St. Wenceslaus, it is one of the many monumental Polish churches visible from the Kennedy Expressway.

History

Founded in 1894 by Resurrectionsists from the city's first Polish parish, St. Stanislaus Kostka, St. Hyacinth became the center of Chicago's most well-known Polish Patch, Jackowo.  The parish has been intimately tied in with Chicago's Polish immigrants, particularly those who arrived in the Solidarity and post-Solidarity waves of Polish migration to Chicago in the 1980s. On June 26, 2003, Pope John Paul II granted the designation of minor basilica, the third church in Illinois to achieve this status. On November 30, 2003, Cardinal Francis George , officially proclaimed St. Hyacinth Church a basilica of the Archdiocese of Chicago.

Neighboring St. Wenceslaus parish was founded in 1912 as a Polish parish to relieve overcrowding at St. Hyacinth parish.

The 1999 film Stir of Echoes was partly filmed at St. Hyacinth Basilica.

Architecture

The church was designed by the architectural firm of Worthmann & Steinbach who built many of the magnificent Polish Cathedrals in Chicago.  The church structure—a red-brick edifice in the classical revival style—has an ornate interior of Baroque influence.  Groundbreaking occurred on April 30, 1917, and the cornerstone was laid on October 21, 1917. Completion of the building was delayed for years by financial and construction difficulties, with the first Mass celebrated in the structure not taking place until August 7, 1921.  Official dedication occurred on October 16, 1921, with Archbishop Cardinal George W. Mundelein presiding.

St. Hyacinth's recognizable three-towered façade is rarely seen in American church architecture as well as the Baroque period that its style is modeled on.  The church bells are a product of the McShoe Bell Foundry of Baltimore, Maryland were blessed and placed in the steeples in April 1924.
St. Hyacinth's bears a striking similarity to St. Mary of the Angels, which was designed by the same architects at about the same time and use the same combination of stone, glazed terra-cotta and brick.  Also like at St. Mary of the Angels, much of the church's interior was decorated by John A. Mallin, who decorated many other churches in Illinois, with two years of planning and another two years to execute the project. St. Hyacinth's is also home to the masterworks of such renowned painters as Tadeusz Żukotyński and Mary Stanisia.  Beginning in the mid-1990s, and taking almost a decade, the interior was renewed thoroughly, much of the mural work being performed by Conrad Schmitt Studios of Wisconsin.

The stained glass windows have been identified as prepared by Meyer Co. of Munich, Germany, and some by the Zettler Co. of New York were installed in 1921. The church's organ is a mid-sized Kilgen organ (of St. Louis, Missouri) with 34 ranks was likewise installed in the church in 1921. The Stations of the Cross were likely assembled in Austria in the 1830s.

A number of statues are found within the basilica's interior. A bas-relief of St. Hyacinth hangs above the main altar, as well as full statues of St. Peter and St. Paul. Figures of the Sacred Heart of Jesus and the Blessed Mother (Immaculate Conception) are found at lesser side altars, along with a figure of Our Lady of Sorrows as a Pietà in the church's eastern alcove. Additionally, sculptures of St. Joseph, St. Ann, the Infant of Prague, St. Maximilian Kolbe, St. Francis of Assisi, St. Anthony of Padua, St. Barbara and St. Thérèse of Lisieux are spread throughout the sanctuary.

A large icon of Our Lady of Częstochowa that was brought in from Poland occupies the shrine in the basilica's western transept. The icon, which had been blessed by Pope John Paul II is crowned in keeping with Roman Catholic tradition, with the Virgin Mary's crown measuring nearly a foot long while the Infant Jesus's crown being slightly smaller in size, each one bookended by bas-relief sculpted angels. Both crowns were crafted by Adam and Kathy Karbownik who melted down the gold and set the gemstones in them, while the jewelry used in the crowns was donated by thousands of parishioners with the gold alone weighed in at ten pounds

Three pairs of monumental bronze doors were hung along the main entrance at the basilica's northern end by famed Polish sculptor Czesław Dźwigaj, well known for also casting the monument of Christ the King in Cicero in front of the church of St. Mary of Częstochowa as well as the Tolerance Monument that was unveiled in Jerusalem.

Monuments to Pope John Paul II, and Father Jerzy Popiełuszko, as well as a memorial to parishioners who served in the Blue Army during World War I can be found in the neighboring 'Garden of Memory'.

Center of Chicago's Polonia

Due to St. Hyacinth's impressive size and history as the center of the neighborhood of first arrival for countless Polish Americans, the Basilica is considered to be the center of Chicago's Polonia, or Polish community.

This has brought notable visitors to St. Hyacinth's who come here to reach out to Chicago's Polish community. General Józef Haller, Prime Minister Stanisław Mikołajczyk, Nobel Peace Prize winner and former President of Poland Lech Wałęsa, and former Premier Jarosław Kaczyński as well as his deceased twin brother President Lech Kaczyński have paid official visits to St. Hyacinth's. Other famous Solidarity activists such as Anna Walentynowicz, Zbigniew Romaszewski and Antoni Macierewicz have visited the Basilica as well. Famous clergy have also visited, including the Servant of God Jan Cieplak as well as the future Pope John Paul II, who trekked to St. Hyacinth's several times as the Archbishop of Cracow and referred to his gatherings there during his 1979 pilgrimage to Chicago.

St. Hyacinth's also served as the place for local and national political elites to publicly cavort for the support of the Polish American electorate with politicians, their first stop as they would tour Chicago's Polish Village along with an obligatory meal at one of the local Polish restaurants. President George H. W. Bush attended mass at St. Hyacinth's twice, first as Vice President in 1985, as well as during his 1988 campaign. Purportedly, violence almost broke out as supporters of Lyndon LaRouche protesting outside the basilica were not looked at very kindly by local Poles, who had a reverence for the candidate they saw as the best hope against the loathed Communist regime in Poland.

Relics
St. Hyacinth Basilica has an impressive collection of relics of Saints of the Roman Catholic Church. A total of 121 relics are encased and presented to the faithful on All Saints Day, as well as the memorial day of each saint. Among them are:

St. Hyacinth
St. Stanislaus Kostka
St. Bonaventure
St. Clara
St. Andrew Bobola
St. John Bosco
St. Maria Goretti
St. Bernadette
St. Julian
Pope Gregory I
St. Elizabeth Seton
St. Francis of Rome
St. Vincent De Paul
St. Ann
St. John Cantius
St. John Chrysostom
St. Blaise
St. Philip Neri
St. Francis Xavier
St. John Berchmans
bl. Angela Truszkowska
St. Faustina Kowalska
St. Hedwig
St. Stanislaus Bishop and Martyr
St. Francis of Assisi
St. Therese of Liseaux
St. Andrew Avellino
St. John Maria Vianney
St. Elizabeth of Hungary
St. Pius X
St. Valentine
St. John Paul II
St. Maravillas de Jesus
St. Simon Ap.
True Cross 
St. John XXIII
Padre Pio
St. Agnes
St. Aloysius Gonzaga

Additionally, a collection of memorabilia of Pope John Paul II hangs next to a plaque honoring him, during whose pontificate the church was titled a Minor Basilica.

St. Hyacinth's today
St. Hyacinth is located in Chicago's Avondale neighborhood. About 8,000 worshippers attend mass every weekend. In keeping with customs brought to the area by Polish immigrants, the area is also known as "Jackowo", as "Jacek" is Polish for the proper name "Hyacinth". Naming neighborhoods or geographical areas after the local parish church is a widespread habit of Polish Catholics.

St. Hyacinth once had a thriving elementary school. In the 60's enrollment was over 2,500 students.  On October 29, 2014, the Archdiocese of Chicago announced the closing of the school after the 2014–2015 school year. Enrollment was only 154 students.

Church in architecture books

See also
Polish Cathedral style churches of Chicago
Polish Americans
Poles in Chicago
Sr. Mary Stanisia
Tadeusz Żukotyński
Roman Catholicism in Poland

References

External links
 
 PGSA - St. Hyacinth Church History
 Archdiocese of Chicago

Hyacinth
Polish Cathedral style architecture
Polish-American culture in Chicago
Resurrectionist Congregation